Eutresis culture is a Final Neolithic and early Bronze Age culture in mainland Greece, also known as Early Helladic I in Helladic chronology.  It was developed directly out of central and southern Greek Final Neolithic culture, and lasted roughy from c.3200 to c.2650 BC.

 Materials and architecture: stones, bones, clay objects and rarely metal are the main materials that were used in everyday life. A distinct fabric was employed for cooking vessels, which were normally dark surfaced. Several jars for storage and cooking were discovered. Signs of fortifications have been discovered in Perachora area. It is believed that the vast majority of the houses were simple with one or two rooms.

 End: it was followed by the more advanced Korakou culture in Greece during the Early Helladic II period of the Early Helladic chronology in the first half of the 3rd Millennium BC.

References

History of Greece
Bronze Age cultures of Europe
Helladic civilization